Perry Griggs (born September 17, 1954) is a former professional American football player who played wide receiver in 1977 for the Baltimore Colts.

External links
Pro-Football-Reference

1954 births
Players of American football from Alabama
American football wide receivers
Baltimore Colts players
Troy Trojans football players
Living people
People from LaFayette, Alabama